EUHS may refer to:
 East Union High School
 Edinburgh University Highland Society